The Graeco-Babyloniaca (singular: Graeco-Babyloniacum) are clay tablets written in the Sumerian or Akkadian languages using cuneiform on one side with transliterations in the Greek alphabet on the other.

Quoting Edmond Sollberger:

As worded by M. J. Geller, they indicate that both Babylonian languages "written in cuneiform characters were still legible in the Seleucid and Parthian periods in Mesopotamia".

References

Further reading

External links
 Tablet (British Museum)

2nd-century BC inscriptions
1st-century BC inscriptions
Greek inscriptions
Sumerian texts
Akkadian inscriptions
Seleucid Empire
Parthian Empire
Clay tablets
Education in classical antiquity